Webster is a town in the northeastern corner of Monroe County, New York, United States. The town is named after orator and statesman Daniel Webster. The population was 42,641 at the 2010 census. The town's motto is "Where Life Is Worth Living." The town contains a village also named Webster.

Geography
The town of Webster is bordered on the north by Lake Ontario, on the east by Wayne County, on the west by Irondequoit Bay and the town of Irondequoit, and on the south by the town of Penfield.

According to the United States Census Bureau, the town has a total area of 35.5 square miles (91.9 km2), of which 33.5 square miles (86.8 km2) is land and 2 square miles (5.2 km2) is water.

Demographics

As of the 2010 United States Census, there were 42,641 people, 17,973 households, and 10,679 families residing in the town. The population density was 1,271.7 people per square mile (789.4/km2). There were 15,218 housing units at an average density of 447.1 per square mile (172.6/km2). The racial makeup of the town was 91.2% White, 2.3% Black or African American, 0.10% Native American, 3.2% Asian, 0.4%, and 2.6% from two or more races. Hispanic or Latino of any race were 2.6% of the population.

Among the 17,973 households, 34.6% had children under the age of 18 living with them, 61.5% were married couples living together, 8.1% had a female householder with no husband present, and 27.6% were non-families. 23.1% of all households were made up of individuals, and 9.0% had someone living alone who was 65 years of age or older. The average household size was 2.56 and the average family size was 3.04.

In the town, the population was spread out, with 21.3% under the age of 18, 5.6% from 18 to 24, 29.9% from 25 to 44, 25.4% from 45 to 64, and 19.2% who were 65 years of age or older. The median age was 39 years. For every 100 females, there were 95.0 males. For every 100 females age 18 and over, there were 91.1 males.

The median income for a household in the town was $58,746, and the median income for a family was $79,225. Males had a median income of $50,263 versus $33,197 for females. The per capita income for the town was $26,791. About 2.5% of families and 4.6% of the population were below the poverty line, including 3.3% of those under age 18 and 4.9% of those age 65 or over.

History
On July 25, 1837, orator and statesman Daniel Webster spoke to a gathering of Whigs in nearby Rochester about the economy. Whig farmers from North Penfield, who were part of Webster's audience, were so impressed by his eloquence that when they petitioned the state legislature for separate town status from Penfield, they chose to name it in his honor. On February 6, 1840, the northern part of Penfield was officially established as the town of Webster, with a population of 2,235. Webster has its own museum dedicated to sharing the town's history with its citizens. The museum has many permanent historical displays and also features changing displays for different times of the year.

Education
Webster's public schools are under the direction of the Webster Central School District (K-12).  While all of its middle schools (Spry, Willink) and high schools (Thomas, Schroeder) are situated in the Town of Webster, only five of its seven elementary schools (DeWitt Road, Klem North, Klem South, Schlegel Road, State Road) are.

Additionally, there are several privately run schools:
Hillside Children's Center Halpern Education Center (grades 6–12), secular
Lakeside Alpha (grades 3–12), Christian Brethren
Rochester Christian School (grades pre-K–8), Calvinist
St. Rita School (grades pre-K–6), operated by the Roman Catholic Diocese of Rochester
Webster Early Learning Center (grades pre-K–1), secular
Webster Montessori School (elementary), ¾ mile south of the town line in Penfield, serves students in the Webster school district

Sports community

On May 15, 2005, Webster was awarded the title of "Number 1 Sportstown in New York" by Sports Illustrated. SI Publisher David Morris said that "Webster's commitment to finding creative and resourceful ways to enhance sports for the well-being of its community fits perfectly with the principles of our Sportstown program, as well as the overall mission of our anniversary celebration."

Webster is part of the section V (Five) New York State Public High School Athletic Association along with the rest of Monroe County, Wayne, Livingston, Yates, Seneca, Steuben, Wyoming, Genesee, Orleans and Allegany.

The Webster Schroeder High School football team has won three New York State Championships in Class AA (a designation based on number of students). At one point, they had a winning streak of 31 games. In the USA Today High School football Super 25, Schroeder was, at one time, ranked #21 in the nation. At least five Webster players have gone on to play Division 1 college football at Syracuse, Michigan and Colgate, among others.

In March 2008, the Webster Thomas High School hockey team, in only its sixth year of competition, won the New York State Championship in Division II, beating Thousand Islands by a score of 5-2. The Webster Thomas soccer team also has won the sectional title 3 years in a row and went on to the state finals in 2007. The soccer team has produced two division 1 soccer athletes both attending Colgate University. The men's lacrosse team won a sectional title in 2009 and has produced many division 1 athletes under Coach Rob Ruller. The women's Lacrosse team has also won a section V title in 2007.

Webster's sports facilities include two lighted stadiums, a hockey/soccer complex, an indoor track and an Olympic-size indoor pool.

Webster has several sports clubs including the Webster Cyclones (youth hockey), Webster Lacrosse Club, and Webster Soccer Association. The annual Webster Lakefront Classic, run by the Webster Soccer Association, is one of the largest soccer tournaments in the Greater Rochester area and takes place annually on Father's Day weekend.

Webster is also home to a summer collegiate wood bat team, the Lake Ontario Ridgemen. The Ridgemen play in the New York Collegiate Baseball League. Their home games are played at Basket Road Stadium. The Ridgemen are run by an organization called Athletes in Action.

In 2014, the Webster Schroeder hockey team won the NYSPHSAA State Championship, beating Beekmantown by a score of 2–0.

Public safety
The Webster Police Department protects the citizens of Webster as a New York State Law Enforcement Accreditation Council agency. Dennis Kohlmeier is the current Chief of the Department. It consists of around thirty sworn officers.

Fire protection is covered by two agencies. On the west side of town, the West Webster Fire District provides fire protection. It is an all-volunteer department. Fire stations are located on Gravel Road, Backus Road, and Plank Road in Penfield.

The east of town, including the village, are protected by the North East Joint Fire District (Webster F.D.) It is an all-volunteer department, as it has been for over one hundred years. Fire stations located on South Avenue in the village, Phillips Road in the town and Plank Road in Penfield.

Ambulance service for the Town is provided by Webster EMS. North East Quadrant Advanced Life Support Inc. provides ALS care for all patients in need.  Webster and West Webster fire departments provide EMS separate from ambulance depending on the severity of the call.

Homicides
On December 7, 2011, 15-year-old Michael Pilato poured gasoline over his house in Webster and set it on fire, killing his father and two brothers (16 and 12 years old) as his mother and teenage sister escaped with injuries. In June 2013, Pilato was convicted of second-degree murder, attempted murder, murder by arson, and arson; he was subsequently sentenced to life in prison.

During the predawn hours of December 24, 2012, 62-year-old William Spengler ambushed volunteer firefighters from the West Webster Fire Department, shooting and killing two and seriously wounding two others as they arrived to put out a car fire on Lake Road. Investigators later determined the fire was started by Spengler. Ultimately seven homes were destroyed because fire fighters were unable to extinguish the flames until the scene was made safe by law enforcement. Volunteer fire fighters Mike Chiapperini (also a lieutenant with the Webster Police Department) and Tomasz Kaczowka died at the scene. Theodore Scardino and Joseph Hofstetter remained hospitalized with serious injuries. John Ritter, a policeman from nearby Greece, New York, happened to be in the area, and was injured by shrapnel.

Spengler had armed himself with three guns: a .38-caliber revolver, a 12-gauge shotgun, and a .223-caliber Bushmaster semiautomatic rifle outfitted with a flash suppressor. Spengler had served 17 years in jail for manslaughter, having been convicted in 1981 of beating his 92-year-old grandmother to death with a hammer in 1980. He shot and killed himself as a SWAT team approached. Later, human remains believed to be those of his elder sister, with whom he had feuded, were found in his house. On December 28, 2012, 24 year-old Dawn Nguyen of Rochester, New York, was arrested and charged in connection with furnishing Spengler with certain weapons in his arsenal which were used in the ambush. In September 2014, she was convicted and sentenced to 8 years in prison. The New York State Senate subsequently included a "Webster provision" in a gun control law passed in the wake of the Sandy Hook Elementary School shooting, mandating life without parole for murderers of emergency personnel.

Notable people
 Elma Bellini - New York Supreme Court Justice
 Brian Bliss - former player for the USA men's national soccer team, former coach of the Major League Soccer Kansas City Wizards, currently technical director for Columbus Crew
 Paul Buchheit - lead developer of gmail and originator of the Google motto "Don't be Evil"
 Grant Catalino - lacrosse player (University of Maryland); Denver MLL draft pick
 Philo Dunning - member of the Wisconsin State Assembly
 Eugene K. Felt - member of the Wisconsin State Assembly
 Susan Gibney - actress
 Gregor Gillespie - professional mixed martial artist
 Lou Gramm- born Louis Andrew Grammatico; May 2, 1950 - Singer, songwriter, performer and lead singer of the rock band Foreigner. Gramm was inducted to the Songwriters Hall of Fame on June 13, 2013.
 Kara Lynn Joyce - swimmer, US National Team, Olympic Medalist in the 2004 and 2008 Summer Olympics
 Pat Kelly - professional American Football Player for the National Football League Denver Broncos
 Brian Kozlowski - professional American Football Player for the National Football League Washington Redskins
 Richard Leone - New Jersey Democratic Party politician; New Jersey State Treasurer
 Edward Tsang Lu - Space Shuttle astronaut (also resided on the International Space Station) 
 Wendy O. Williams - late singer (The Plasmatics)

Communities and locations in the Town of Webster 
Avalon Estates – A neighborhood development located off Phillips Rd.
Lake Road – A neighborhood also known as Fieldcrest located on Webster's east side. It runs along the town's northeastern Lake Ontario shoreline.
Forest Lawn – A neighborhood in the northwest part of the town, on the shore of Lake Ontario.
Gallant Fox and Meadow Breeze - Two neighborhoods connected that feed to Webster Schools Schlegel, Willink and Thomas. Both contain Cul de Sacs, Nature Trail Cir, and Birch View Ln. Gallant Fox is within close walking distance to Hedges Nine Mile Point Restaurant and Bar, and Mama Lor's Restaurant.
Glen Edith – A location on the west side of the town, on the shore of Irondequoit Bay.
Oakmonte – A large neighborhood in the central-southern part of the town consisting of private homes, apartments, and town homes.
Parkwood- a smaller neighborhood with its main entrance off of Klem Road and directly across from Klem North Elementary School. This neighborhood also houses a community park that shares its name.
Union Hill – A hamlet on the Wayne County line at the intersection of NY-404 and Ridge Road.
Webster (village), New York, located in the center of the town
West Webster – A hamlet at the intersection of Ridge and Gravel Road.

See also
Webster Public Library - serves the town of Webster, located at 980 Ridge Road

References

Further reading
Dunn, Esther.  Webster Through the Years. Webster, NY: Webster Town Board, 1971.

External links

Webster Chamber of Commerce
Webster Public Library
The Webster Museum

Rochester metropolitan area, New York
Towns in Monroe County, New York
Ukrainian communities in the United States
1840 establishments in New York (state)
Populated places established in 1840